{{Infobox settlement
|name               = Famagusta
|native_name        = 
|image_skyline      = Famagusta 01-2017 img14 Lala Mustafa Pasha Mosque.jpg
|imagesize          =
|image_caption      = Lala Mustafa Pasha Mosque
|image_flag         =
|image_seal         =
|pushpin_map        = Cyprus
|pushpin_mapsize    = 300
|subdivision_type       = Country 
|subdivision_name       = 
|subdivision_type1      =  • District
|subdivision_name1      = Famagusta District
|subdivision_type2      = Country {{nobold|(de facto)}}
|subdivision_name2      = 
|subdivision_type3      =  • District
|subdivision_name3      = Gazimağusa District
|TotalArea_sq_mi    =
|area_total         =
|leader_title       = Mayor
|leader_name        = Süleyman Uluçay
|leader_title2      =
|leader_name2       = 
|population_as_of   = 2019
|population_footnotes = 
| population_blank1_title         = Municipality
| population_blank1               = 55648(District:91,307)
| population_note                 = 
|coordinates        = 
|timezone           = EET
|utc_offset         = +2
|timezone_DST       = EEST
|utc_offset_DST     = +3
|website            = Famagusta Turkish municipality (in Famagusta)Greek Cypriot municipality (in exile)
}}

Famagusta (or  ) is a city on the east coast of Cyprus. It is located east of Nicosia and possesses the deepest harbour of the island. During the Middle Ages (especially under the maritime republics of Genoa and Venice), Famagusta was the island's most important port city and a gateway to trade with the ports of the Levant, from where the Silk Road merchants carried their goods to Western Europe. The old walled city and parts of the modern city are a de jure  territory of Republic of Cyprus, currently under the de facto control of Northern Cyprus as the capital of the Gazimağusa District.

Name
In antiquity, the town was known as Arsinoe, after the Greek queen Arsinoe II of Egypt, and was mentioned by that name by Strabo. 
In the 3rd century book Stadiasmus Maris Magni, is written as Ammochostos, meaning "hidden in [the] sand", which is how Greeks still call it. This name developed into Famagusta (originally Famagouste in French and Famagosta in Italian), used in Western European languages, and to its Turkish name, Mağusa. In Turkish, the city is also called ; Gazi means veteran in Turkish (ultimately from Arabic, meaning one who fights in a holy war), and the city has been officially awarded with the title  after 1974 (compare Gaziantep). The old town is nicknamed "the city of 365 churches" owing to a legend that at its peak, Famagusta boasted one church for each day of the year.

History
The city was founded around 274 BC, after the serious damage to Salamis by an earthquake, by Ptolemy II Philadelphus and named "Arsinoe" after his sister. Arsinoe was described as a "fishing town" by Strabo in his Geographica in the first century BC. It remained a small fishing village for a long time. Later, as a result of the gradual evacuation of Salamis due to the Arab invasion led by Muawiyah I, it developed into a small port.

Medieval Famagusta

The turning point for Famagusta was 1192 with the onset of Lusignan rule. It was during this period that Famagusta developed as a fully-fledged town. It increased in importance to the Eastern Mediterranean due to its natural harbour and the walls that protected its inner town. Its population began to increase. This development accelerated in the 13th century as the town became a centre of commerce for both the East and West. An influx of Christian refugees fleeing the downfall of Acre (1291) in Palestine transformed it from a tiny village into one of the richest cities in Christendom.

In 1372 the port was seized by Genoa and in 1489 by Venice. This commercial activity turned Famagusta into a place where merchants and ship owners led lives of luxury. By the mid-14th century, Famagusta was said to have the richest citizens in the world. The belief that people's wealth could be measured by the churches they built inspired these merchants to have churches built in varying styles. These churches, which still exist, were the reason Famagusta came to be known as "the district of churches". The development of the town focused on the social lives of the wealthy people and was centred upon the Lusignan palace, the cathedral, the Square and the harbour.

Ottoman Famagusta

In 1570–1571, Famagusta was the last stronghold in Venetian Cyprus to hold out against the Turks under Mustafa Pasha. It resisted a siege of thirteen months and a terrible bombardment, until at last the garrison surrendered. The Ottoman forces had lost 50,000 men, including Mustafa Pasha's son. Although the surrender terms had stipulated that the Venetian forces be allowed to return home, the Venetian commander, Marco Antonio Bragadin, was flayed alive, his lieutenant Tiepolo was hanged, and many other Christians were killed.

With the advent of the Ottoman rule, Latins lost their privileged status in Famagusta and were expelled from the city. Greek Cypriots natives were at first allowed to own and buy property in the city, but were banished from the walled city in 1573–74 and had to settle outside in the area that later developed into Varosha. Turkish families from Anatolia were resettled in the walled city but could not fill the buildings that previously hosted a population of 10,000. This caused a drastic decrease in the population of Famagusta. Merchants from Famagusta, who mostly consisted of Latins that had been expelled, resettled in Larnaca and as Larnaca flourished, Famagusta lost its importance as a trade centre. Over time, Varosha developed into a prosperous agricultural town thanks to its location away from the marshes, whilst the walled city remained dilapidated.

In the walled city, some buildings were repurposed to serve the interests of the Muslim population: the Cathedral of St. Nicholas was converted to a mosque (now known as Lala Mustafa Pasha Mosque), a bazaar was developed, public baths, fountains and a theological school were built to accommodate the inhabitants' needs. Dead end streets, an Ottoman urban characteristic, was imported to the city and a communal spirit developed in which a small number of two-storey houses inhabited by the small upper class co-existed with the widespread one-storey houses.

British rule

With the British takeover, Famagusta regained its significance as a port and an economic centre and its development was specifically targeted in British plans. As soon as the British took over the island, a Famagusta Development Act was passed that aimed at the reconstruction and redevelopment of the city's streets and dilapidated buildings as well as better hygiene. The port was developed and expanded between 1903 and 1906 and Cyprus Government Railway, with its terminus in Famagusta, started construction in 1904. Whilst Larnaca continued to be used as the main port of the island for some time, after Famagusta's use as a military base in World War I trade significantly shifted to Famagusta. The city outside the walls grew at an accelerated rate, with development being centred around Varosha. Varosha became the administrative centre as the British moved their headquarters and residences there and tourism grew significantly in the last years of the British rule. Pottery and production of citrus and potatoes also significantly grew in the city outside the walls, whilst agriculture within the walled city declined to non-existence.

New residential areas were built to accommodate the increasing population towards the end of the British rule, and by 1960, Famagusta was a modern port city extending far beyond Varosha and the walled city.

The British period saw a significant demographic shift in the city. In 1881, Christians constituted 60% of the city's population while Muslims were at 40%. By 1960, the Turkish Cypriot population had dropped to 17.5% of the overall population, while the Greek Cypriot population had risen to 70%. The city was also the site for one of the British internment camps for nearly 50,000 Jewish survivors of the Holocaust trying to emigrate to Palestine.

From independence to the Turkish invasion

From independence in 1960 to the Turkish invasion of Cyprus of 1974, Famagusta developed toward the south west of Varosha as a tourist centre. In the late 1960s Famagusta became a well-known entertainment and tourist centre. The contribution of Famagusta to the country's economic activity by 1974 far exceeded its proportional dimensions within the country. Whilst its population was only about 7% of the total of the country, Famagusta by 1974 accounted for over 10% of the total industrial employment and production of Cyprus, concentrating mainly on light industry compatible with its activity as a tourist resort and turning out high-quality products ranging from food, beverages and tobacco to clothing, footwear, plastics, light machinery and transport equipment. It contributed 19.3% of the business units and employed 21.3% of the total number of persons engaged in commerce on the island.
It acted as the main tourist destination of Cyprus, hosting 31.5% of the hotels and 45% of Cyprus' total bed capacity.
Varosha acted as the main touristic and business quarters.

In this period, the urbanisation of Famagusta slowed down and the development of the rural areas accelerated. Therefore, economic growth was shared between the city of Famagusta and the district, which had a balanced agricultural economy, with citrus, potatoes, tobacco and wheat as main products. Famagusta maintained good communications with this hinterland. The city's port remained the island's main seaport and in 1961, it was expanded to double its capacity in order to accommodate the growing volume of exports and imports. The port handled 42.7% of Cypriot exports, 48.6% of imports and 49% of passenger traffic.

There has not been an official census since 1960 but the population of the town in 1974 was estimated to be around 39,000 not counting about 12,000–15,000 persons commuting daily from the surrounding villages and suburbs to work in Famagusta. The number of people staying in the city would swell to about 90,000–100,000 during the peak summer tourist period, with the influx of tourists from numerous European countries, mainly Britain, France, Germany and the Scandinavian countries. The majority of the city population were Greek Cypriots (26,500), with 8,500 Turkish Cypriots and 4,000 people from other ethnic groups.

From the Turkish invasion to the present

During the second phase of the Turkish invasion of Cyprus on 14 August 1974 the Mesaoria plain was overrun by Turkish tanks and Famagusta was bombed by Turkish aircraft. It took two days for the Turkish Army to occupy the city, prior to which Famagusta's entire Greek Cypriot population had fled into surrounding fields. As a result of Turkish airstrikes dozens of civilians died, including tourists.

Unlike other parts of the Turkish-controlled areas of Cyprus, the Varosha suburb of Famagusta was fenced off by the Turkish army immediately after being captured and remained fenced off until October 2020, when the TRNC reopened some streets to visitors. Some Greek Cypriots who had fled Varosha have been allowed to view the town and journalists have been allowed in.

UN Security Council resolution 550 (1984) considers any attempts to settle any part of Famagusta by people other than its inhabitants as inadmissible and calls for the transfer of this area to the administration of the UN. The UN's Security Council resolution 789 (1992) also urges that with a view to the implementation of resolution 550 (1984), the area at present under the control of the United Nations Peace-keeping Force in Cyprus be extended to include Varosha.

 Cityscape

Famagusta's historic city centre is surrounded by the fortifications of Famagusta, which have a roughly rectangular shape, built mainly by the Venetians in the 15th and 16th centuries, though some sections of the walls have been dated earlier times, as far as 1211. Some important landmarks and visitor attractions in the old city are:
 The Lala Mustafa Pasha Mosque
 The Othello Castle
 Palazzo del Provveditore - the Venetian palace of the governor, built on the site of the former Lusignan royal palace
 St. Francis' Church
 Sinan Pasha Mosque
 Church of St. George of the Greeks
 Church of St. George of the Latins
 Twin Churches
 Nestorian Church (of St George the Exiler)
 Namık Kemal Dungeon
 Agios Ioannis Church
 Venetian House
 Akkule Masjid
 Mustafa Pasha Mosque
 Ganchvor monastery

In an October 2010 report titled Saving Our Vanishing Heritage, Global Heritage Fund listed Famagusta, a "maritime ancient city of crusader kings", among the 12 sites most "On the Verge" of irreparable loss and destruction, citing insufficient management and development pressures.

Economy

Famagusta is an important commercial hub of Northern Cyprus. The main economic activities in the city are tourism, education, construction and industrial production. It has a 115-acre free port, which is the most important seaport of Northern Cyprus for travel and commerce.Guide to Foreign Investors (2004), TRNC State Planning Organization, p. 18-19. The port is an important source of income and employment for the city, though its volume of trade is restricted by the embargo against Northern Cyprus. Its historical sites, including the walled city, Salamis, the Othello Castle and the St Barnabas Church, as well as the sandy beaches surrounding it make it a tourist attraction; efforts are also underway to make the city more attractive for international congresses. The Eastern Mediterranean University is also an important employer and supplies significant income and activity, as well as opportunities for the construction sector. The university also raises a qualified workforce that stimulates the city's industry and makes communications industry viable. The city has two industrial zones: the Large Industrial Zone and the Little Industrial Zone. The city is also home to a fishing port, but inadequate infrastructure of the port restricts the growth of this sector. The industry in the city has traditionally been concentrated on processing agricultural products.

Historically, the port was the primary source of income and employment for the city, especially right after 1974. However, it gradually lost some of its importance to the economy as the share of its employees in the population of Famagusta diminished due to various reasons. However, it still is the primary port for commerce in Northern Cyprus, with more than half of ships that came to Northern Cyprus in 2013 coming to Famagusta. It is the second most popular seaport for passengers, after Kyrenia, with around 20,000 passengers using the port in 2013.

 Politics 
The mayor-in-exile of Famagusta is Simos Ioannou. Süleyman Uluçay heads the Turkish Cypriot municipal administration of Famagusta, which remains legal as a communal-based body under the constitutional system of the Republic of Cyprus.

Since 1974, Greek Cypriots submitted a number of proposals within the context of bicommunal discussions for the return of Varosha to UN administration, allowing the return of its previous inhabitants, requesting also the opening of Famagusta harbour for use by both communities. Varosha would have been returned to Greek Cypriot control as part of the 2004 Annan Plan had the plan had been accepted by a majority of Greek Cypriot voters.

Culture

The walled city of Famagusta contains many unique buildings. Famagusta has a walled city popular with tourists.

Every year, the International Famagusta Art and Culture Festival is organized in Famagusta. Concerts, dance shows and theater plays take place during the festival.

A growth in tourism and the city's university have fueled the development of Famagusta's vibrant nightlife. Nightlife in the city is especially active on Wednesday, Friday and Saturday nights and in the hotter months of the year, starting from April. Larger hotels in the city have casinos that cater to their customers. Salamis Road is an area of Famagusta with a heavy concentration of bars frequented by students and locals.

Famagusta's Othello Castle is the setting for Shakespeare's play Othello. The city was also the setting for Victoria Hislop's 2015 novel The Sunrise, and Michael Paraskos's 2016 novel In Search of Sixpence. The city is the birthplace of the eponymous hero of the Renaissance proto-novel Fortunatus.

Sports

Famagusta was home to many Greek Cypriot sport teams that left the city because of the Turkish invasion and still bear their original names. Most notable football clubs originally from the city are Anorthosis Famagusta FC and Nea Salamis Famagusta FC, both of the Cypriot First Division, which are now based in Larnaca. Usually Anorthosis Famagusta fans are politically right wing where Nea Salamis fans are left wing.

Famagusta is represented by Mağusa Türk Gücü in the Turkish Cypriot First Division. Dr. Fazıl Küçük Stadium is the largest football stadium in Famagusta. Many Turkish Cypriot sport teams that left Southern Cyprus because of the Cypriot intercommunal violence are based in Famagusta.

Famagusta is represented by DAÜ Sports Club and Magem Sports Club in North Cyprus First Volleyball Division. Gazimağusa Türk Maarif Koleji represents Famagusta in the North Cyprus High School Volleyball League.

Famagusta has a modern volleyball stadium called the Mağusa Arena.

Education

The Eastern Mediterranean University was founded in the city in 1979. The Istanbul Technical University founded a campus in the city in 2010.

The Cyprus College of Art was founded in Famagusta by the Cypriot artist Stass Paraskos in 1969, before moving to Paphos in 1972 after protests from local hoteliers that the presence of art students in the city was putting off holidaymakers.

 Healthcare 
Famagusta has three general hospitals.

Personalities
 

 Saint Barnabas, born and died in Salamis, Famagusta
 Chris Achilleos, illustrator of the book versions on the BBC children's series Doctor Who
 Beran Bertuğ, former Governor of Famagusta, first Cypriot woman to hold this position
 Marios Constantinou former international Cypriot football midfielder and current manager.
 Eleftheria Eleftheriou, Cypriot singer.
 Derviş Eroğlu, former President of Northern Cyprus
 Alexis Galanos, 7th President of the House of Representatives and Famagusta mayor-in-exile (2006-2019) (Republic of Cyprus)
 Xanthos Hadjisoteriou, Cypriot painter
 Oz Karahan, political activist, President of the Union of Cypriots
 Oktay Kayalp, former Turkish Cypriot Famagusta mayor (Northern Cyprus)
 Harry Luke British diplomat
 Angelos Misos, former international footballer
Costas Montis was an influential and prolific Greek Cypriot poet, novelist, and playwright born in Famagusta.
 Hal Ozsan, actor (Dawson's Creek, Kyle XY)
Dimitris Papadakis a Greek Cypriot politician, who served as a Member of the European Parliament.
 Ṣubḥ-i-Azal, Persian religious leader, lived and died in exile in Famagusta 
 Touker Suleyman (born Türker Süleyman) British Turkish Cypriot fashion retail entrepreneur, investor and reality television personality.
 George Vasiliou, former President of Cyprus
 Vamik Volkan, Emeritus Professor of Psychiatry
 Derviş Zaim, film director

International relations

Twin towns – sister cities
Famagusta is twinned with:

 İzmir, Turkey (since 1974)
 Corfu, Greece (since 1994)
 Patras, Greece (since 1994)
 Antalya, Turkey (since 1997)
 Salamina (city), Greece (since 1998)
 Struga, North Macedonia
 Athens, Greece (since 2005)

References

Sources
 
 Enlart, Camille (1899). L'art gothique et la Renaissance a Chypre. Paris, pp. 251–255.
 Magusa.org (English) . Official website of Famagusta.
 
 
 Smith, William (1854). Dictionary of Greek and Roman Geography. s.v. Arsinoe
 

Further reading
 Weyl Carr, Annemarie (ed.), Famagusta, Volume 1. Art and Architecture (= Mediterranean Nexus 1100-1700. Conflict, Influence and Inspiration in the Mediterranean Area 2), Turnhout: Brepols Publishers, 2014. 
 DVD / Film: The Stones of Famagusta: the Story of a Forgotten City (2008); Allan Langdale, ″In a Contested Realm: An Illustrated Guide to the Archaeology and Historical Architecture of Northern Cyprus (2012).

External links

Konrad von Grünenberg, complete online facsimile of Beschreibung der Reise von Konstanz nach Jerusalem.
Famagusta City Guide
Famagusta, 2015 The New York Times feature article
Complete online facsimile of Camile Enlart, L'art gothique et la renaissance en Chypre : illustré de 34 planches et de 421 figures'', Paris, E. Leroux, 1899.
Old maps of Famagusta, Historic Cities site

 
3rd-century BC establishments
Populated places established in the 3rd century BC
Populated places in ancient Cyprus
Cities in ancient Cyprus
Mediterranean port cities and towns in Northern Cyprus
Municipalities in Famagusta District
Populated places in Gazimağusa District
Populated coastal places in Northern Cyprus
Historic sites in Cyprus